Ronald Orlando Lawrence Kay-Shuttleworth, 3rd Baron Shuttleworth (1917– 17 November 1942) was a British Army officer, peer, and landowner, and a member of the House of Lords from 1940 until his death.

The second son of Captain Lawrence Ughtred Kay-Shuttleworth, eldest son of Ughtred Kay-Shuttleworth, 1st Baron Shuttleworth, and his wife Selina Adine Bridgeman, he was educated at Eton College and Balliol College, Oxford.

In 1940, he succeeded his older brother as Baron Shuttleworth, of Gawthorpe (created 1902), and also to a baronetcy created in 1849, and inherited the Gawthorpe Hall estate at Ightenhill.

Shuttleworth was commussioned into the Royal Artillery and fought in the North African campaign of the Second World War. In November 1942 he was killed in action.

Notes

People educated at Eton College
Alumni of Balliol College, Oxford
1917 births
1942 deaths